is a railway station of JR Hokkaido on the Nemuro Main Line located in Kushiro, Hokkaidō, Japan. The station opened on March 13, 1988.

Railway stations in Hokkaido Prefecture
Stations of Hokkaido Railway Company
Railway stations in Japan opened in 1988